This is a list of years in Japan. See also the timeline of Japanese history.  For only articles about years in Japan that have been written, see :Category:Years in Japan.

List of years in Japan

First century

Seventh century

Eighth century

Ninth century

Tenth century

Eleventh century

Twelfth century

Thirteenth century

Fourteenth century

Fifteenth century

Sixteenth century

Seventeenth century

Eighteenth century

Nineteenth century

Twentieth century

Twenty-first century

See also
 Timeline of Japanese history

 
Japan history-related lists
Japan